A minisaga, mini saga or mini-saga is a short story based on a long story. It should contain exactly 50 words, plus a title of up to 15 characters. However, the title requirement is not always enforced and sometimes eliminated altogether. Minisagas are alternately known as microstories, ultra-shorts stories, or fifty-word stories.

The form was invented by writer Brian Aldiss and the newspaper The Daily Telegraph, which has held several minisaga competitions, as has BBC Radio 4.

Uses 
Minisagas are used in business, as an educational tool, a creative outlet, and a source of entertainment.  They are not poems, but rather "bite-sized lessons for life and business".  They are often used to stimulate creativity, stretch one's thinking, determine the essential elements of a story, or enhance discipline in writing. They often attempt to be funny or surprising.  

Below is an example by author Daniel H. Pink:
When I was shot, fear seized me at first. No surprise that. But once I realized I wasn't going to die – despite the thermonuclear pain and widening puddle of weirdly warm blood – my mind recalibrated. And one thought, comforting yet disturbing, leapt into my head: I need to Tweet this.

There is a limited publishing market for minisagas, but minisaga contests are sometimes held by various publishers or websites, and a dedicated market for "50-word stories" exists at FiftyWordStories.com, with payments available for each month's strongest story.

See also

 Drabble
 Flash fiction
 Literature
 Short story

References

 Aldiss, Brian. Mini-Sagas: From the Daily Telegraph Competition 2001. Enitharmon, 2001. 
Short story types

External links